Transit of Venus is an opera in three acts by Victor Davies. The English libretto is by Canadian playwright Maureen Hunter based on her play of the same name first produced at the Manitoba Theatre Centre in November 1992.

Performance history
The opera was first performed by Manitoba Opera on November 24, 2007.

Roles

Synopsis
The story is based on the expeditions of the 18th-century French astronomer, Guillaume le Gentil de la Galaisière. He attempted to record the transit of the planet Venus across the sun as a way of estimating the distance between the earth and the sun. Celeste, his fiancée, loves him at first but then turns to his 
assistant, Demarais.

References
Manitoba Opera page about the opera, accessed 26 October 2008

English-language operas
2007 operas
Operas
Transit of Venus
2007 establishments in Manitoba